Kamsar (also Romanized as Kamsār and Komsār; also known as Komsara, Kūchak Komsār, and Kūmsār) is a village in Gasht Rural District, in the Central District of Fuman County, Gilan Province, Iran. At the 2006 census, its population was 232, in 67 families.

References 

Populated places in Fuman County